Tsootsha, also known as Kalkfontein, is a village in Ghanzi District of Botswana. It is located close to the border with Namibia. The population was 1,397 in 2001 census.

References

Ghanzi District
Villages in Botswana